Gyrineum roseum is a species of predatory sea snail, a marine gastropod mollusc in the family Cymatiidae.

Taxonomy
This species possibly intergrades clinally with G. pusillum; DNA analysis would help.

Description

Distribution
This marine species occurs off Tahiti and in the Coral Sea.

References

 Beu, A.G., 1998. Indo-West Pacific Ranellidae, Bursidae and Personidae (Mollusca: Gastropoda). A monograph of the New Caledonian fauna and revision of related taxa. Mémoires du Muséum national d'Histoire naturelle 178: 1-255
 Liu, J.Y. [Ruiyu] (ed.). (2008). Checklist of marine biota of China seas. China Science Press. 1267 pp.

Cymatiidae
Gastropods described in 1844